Niehues is a German toponymic surname, i.e. it has its source in the type of residence the family lived in.

Etymology and pronunciation 

The name Niehues etymologically comes from West Low German (here: Westphalian) dialects, being a compound word meaning "new house" (the High German variant of the name is Neuhaus).

The pronunciation of the name does not entirely follow High German pronunciation rules. The second vowel sound is written like the alternative High German spelling of an umlaut-ü sound, but it is pronounced like a normal u sound (as in English pool).  

Due to the non-standard German origin of the name, it is often misspelled or mispronounced even by Germans, if they are unfamiliar with the dialect.

Origin and distribution 

In today's Germany, the name Niehues can be found mostly in the regions where the Westphalian dialect is or was spoken, predominantly in the adjacent cities and districts Münster, Coesfeld, Steinfurt, Recklinghausen, Borken and Unna in the northwest of Germany close to the border of the Netherlands.

Outside of Germany, families named Niehues settled especially in the United States (here predominantly in Kansas, also in Texas, California, Louisiana and Ohio) and in Brazil.

Geographical distribution
As of 2014, 60.8% of all known bearers of the surname Niehues were residents of Germany (frequency 1:19,098), 31.7% of Brazil (1:93,342) and 5.8% of the United States (1:903,128).

In Germany, the frequency of the surname was higher than national average (1:19,098) in the following states:
 1. North Rhine-Westphalia (1:5,104)
 2. Bremen (1:15,687)

In Brazil, the frequency of the surname was higher than national average (1:93,342) in the following states:
 1. Santa Catarina (1:4,429)
 2. Paraná (1:24,508)
 3. Alagoas (1:65,622)

People 

 Alfonso Niehues, Brazilian former archbishop at the Roman Catholic Archdiocese of Florianópolis, Brazil
 Franz-Josef Niehues, mayor of the municipality Rosendahl, near Coesfeld, Germany 
 James Niehues, American resort and panoramic illustrator
 Leandro Niehues, former Brazilian soccer coach of Clube Atlético Paranaense
 Maximilian Schulze Niehues, German soccer player currently playing for Preußen Münster (*1988)
 Stefan Niehues, German freelance wargaming miniature figure designer, has worked also for Wyrd Miniatures
 Maiara Carolina Niehues, Brazilian soccer player, Sport Club Internacional

Places 

In Germany, some place names are derived from farms bearing the (sometimes former) owner's name, for example Niehues near Nottuln. Also streets have been named after people named Niehues in Germany (e.g. Propst-Niehues-Straße in Marl, Niehuesstraße in Everswinkel), the Netherlands (e.g. Abraham Niehuesstraat in Hoogeveen) and Brazil (e.g. Rua João Teodoro Niehues in Braço do Norte), and Rua Antonio Niehues in {[Capanema - PR]}.

See also 

 Neuhaus (surname)
 Niehaus
 Nijhuis, a Dutch counterpart of the name

References 

German toponymic surnames
German-language surnames
Low German surnames